First Pinarayi Vijayan ministry is the Council of Ministers headed by Pinarayi Vijayan that was formed after the Left Democratic Front (LDF) won the 2016 Kerala Legislative Assembly elections. The Council assumed office on 25 May 2016. The ministry had a total of 19 ministers in the Cabinet at the time of swearing-in compared to 21 ministers in the previous government. Pinarayi Vijayan sworn in as 22nd Chief Minister of Kerala, 12th person to hold this position. Chief Minister Pinarayi Vijayan on 3 May 2021 submitted the resignation of the Council of Ministers headed by him to Governor Arif Mohammed Khan after winning a historic victory in the 15th legislative assembly elections by winning 99 of the 140 seats in the Assembly.

Council of Ministers

Chair and chief whip

Ex-Ministers
 E. P. Jayarajan (CPI(M)) – Minister for Industries and Sports until his resignation on 14 October 2016 because of charges of nepotism. In September 2017, the Vigilance and Anti-Corruption Bureau (VACB) acquitted Jayarajan in the nepotism case and sought to close the case. Jayarajan was re-inducted into the cabinet on 14 August 2018.
A. K. Saseendran (NCP) – Minister for Transport from 25 May 2016 until his resignation on 26 March 2017 after a sting operation revealed him seeking sexual favours from a woman. In November 2017, Saseendran received a clean chit from the inquiry commission which said that it had no conclusive evidence before it to prove the charge.
Thomas Chandy (NCP) – Minister for Transport (from 1 April 2017 to 15 November 2017). The businessman-turned-politician resigned over allegations that he had encroached on water bodies and public land and converted paddy fields for a private hotel project. He died on 20 December 2019.
Mathew T. Thomas (Janata Dal (Secular)) – Minister for Water Resources until his resignation on 26 November 2018.
K. T. Jaleel - Minister for Higher Education and Minority Welfare - resigned in April 2021 following Lokayukta finding him guilty on nepotism charges. Earlier Jaleel was quizzed multiple times by Enforcement Directorate in connection with dollar and gold smuggling through United Arab Emirates consulate.

Awards and appreciation
The Kerala government under the leadership of Pinarayi Vijayan won the following awards:

 Recognised as the best governed state in India by Public Affairs Centre for three consecutive years (2016, 2017, 2018)
 Ranked first in United Nations Sustainable Development Index (2018, 2019) released by NITI Ayog and UN
 Ranked first in NITI Aayog Sustainable Development Index
 Second least corrupt state as per the Centre for Media Studies (2018)
 Pradhan Mantri Surakshit Matritva Abhiyan Award for the state with lowest maternal mortality
UN Inter-Agency Task Force on the Prevention and Control of Non-communicable Diseases (UNIATF) award 2020
Kerala Number 1 in overall health index: NITI Aayog
Kerala ranks fifth in NITI Aayog’s Innovation Index
First in the National School Education (NSE) Index by the NITI Aayog
Kerala  Tops in  New Migrant Policy Index
Kerala tops NITIAayog’s School Education Quality Index
Kerala was ranked 1 in overall performance of state in health outcomes index
Kerala feature in the top ten rankings in NITI Aayog releases report on Export Preparedness Index 2020
Kerala was adjudged the best-governed state in the country, according to the Public Affairs Index-2020 released by the Public Affairs Centre

Achievements
Built over 2,00,000 houses for the homeless and landless under Life mission (launched in 2017).
 28,000 houses were completed as part of Livelihood Inclusion and Financial Empowerment, a comprehensive housing scheme for all the landless and homeless in the state.
Implemented a comprehensive development scheme and was therefore ranked first in United Nations Sustainable Development Index (2018) and NITI Aayog Sustainable Development Index.
Took over and completed the previously deserted Edamon- Kochi 400 KV transmission line.
Re-hauling the Public sector enterprise, Kerala Automobiles Limited and successfully spearheaded the effort to start commercial-scale production of Kerala’s own e-auto ‘Neem-G’, marking the first time a public sector venture entering the Electric Vehicle market.
Successfully planned and implemented the "apna Ghar" scheme that provides state of the art housing facilities for migrant workers .
Successfully brought in 165 companies to IT park creating 50,000 jobs within 1000 days.
 Reduced overall loss of Public Sector companies which stood at Rs. 131.0 crores in 2015–16 to Rs. 71.34 crores in 2016–17 with making thirteen of them operating at a marginal profit in 2016–17. Within 1000 days of office, PSUs went from netting Rs. 131.0 crores in losses to over Rs. 160 Crore in profits .
 Established Institute of Advanced Virology (IAV) in the state and became the first in the country to be linked with the Global Virus Network.
Doubled the social security pensions for the marginalized and elderly compared to the previous UDF government.
Established minimum wage scheme in 26 sectors to prevent exploitation of employees.
Successfully ensured minimum wages and social security measures for the migrant workers.
17182 km of rivers and streams that were stalled or contaminated were rejuvenated, 48936 wells were recharged and 9889 ponds reformed in the first 1000 days in office.
 1,03,361 title deeds were distributed among various communities.
Record growth of milk production increasing daily production by over 2,60,000 litres per day within 1000 days in power 
Education Department set up 45,000 hi-tech classrooms in public schools.
Over 2000 Crore Indian rupees infused to rejuvenate the public school system.
Witnessed exponential increase in number of students enrolled in public schools for all three years, the highest growth in past 25 years.
Education Department has also ensured free textbooks and uniforms for all the students.
Jana Maithri project implementation at all police stations.
 Haritha Kerala Mission projects implemented for waste management, organic farming and water resources management.
 Revived agrarian practice of the state through Agriculture Department by cultivating paddy cultivation in 34,000 acres of land, and building new traditions like "Year of Paddy."
 Created innovative and accessible educational programs that gives youth employment ready skills and competence through Kerala Academy for Skill Excellence (KASE).
 Reduced class division especially by appointing non-Brahmins and Dalits as priests in temples under the Travancore Devaswom Board (TDB).
 Committed to increasing state's power sources and consumption, in the meantime by stopping power cuts and load shedding and by initiating hydro-electric power projects in Vellathooval, Pathankayam, Perunthenaruvi, Pallivasal, Thottiyar and Chathankottunada.
Rebuild Kerala Initiative.
 Conducting studies to develop new tourism spots and renovating existing ones to create employment and taxation opportunities.
 Abolishing an illegal practice among worker class known as "nokkukooli" — a money extortion formality that were held by certain labor unions without doing any work.
 Implementing Road infrastructure projects – Coastal Highway and Hill Highway (Kerala).
 Acquired land for Amballur Electronic Hardware Park for developing a new source for economic growth and creating job opportunities/increasing purchasing power of citizens.
 Implementing GAIL pipeline between Mangalore and Kochi, a national project.
Completion of Kollam Bypass Alappuzha Bypass in National Highway 66. Speeding up and completion of land acquisition for National Highway 66 from Thalappady, Kasaragod to Ramanattukara with commencements of work.
Completion of overpass at Vyttila, Kundannoor, and rebuilding controversial Palarivattom Flyover.
Announcing Kochi Water Metro and commencement of works.
The DPR of Thiruvananthapuram–Kasargode Semi High Speed Rail Corridor(K-RAIL) submitted to central government after completing environment impact study.
Established Kerala Administrative Service in 2018.

Political changes 

The ruling left democratic front (LDF) in the state has added four new political parties under its fold, becoming a 10-member strong front. The new entrants are Indian National League (INL), Loktantrik Janata Dal (LJD), Democratic Kerala Congress (DKC) and Kerala Congress (B).
The Kerala Congress (M) joined Left Democratic Front in October 2020. This move have given inroads to LDF in Kottayam district and nearby areas with large number of Christian voters.
 In February 2021 ahead of the polls, the LDF Member of the Legislative Assembly from Pala (State Assembly constituency), Mani C. Kappan left the alliance and formed the Nationalist Congress Kerala leaving Nationalist Congress Party to contest elections from Pala on UDF ticket. The decision was due to the LDF's decision to give Pala seat to Kerala Congress (M) for the 2021 Kerala Legislative Assembly election.  Mani C. Kappan the sitting MLA from Pala had won this seat in 2019 Kerala Legislative Assembly by-elections by defeating  UDF and ending a 49 year long Kerala Congress streak in the constituency.

Allegations 

 Sabarimala controversy.
The UDF-led opposition alleged charges of nepotism. 
 Sprinklr data controversy during COVID-19 pandemic.
Life Mission controversy
 Kerala Public Service Commission row over delay of appointments from rank lists to permanent posts.
 Deep sea fishing controversy over deal between Kerala Industrial Development Corporation (KIDC) and EMCC International India Private Limited.
Covid protocol violations.

See also
 List of Kerala ministers
 Chief Ministers of Kerala
 History of Kerala
 List of current Indian chief ministers
 Pinarayi Vijayan
 Second Oommen Chandy ministry

References

External links
 Cabinet, Government of Kerala 

Kerala ministries
2016 in Indian politics
Communist Party of India (Marxist) state ministries
Communist Party of India
Nationalist Congress Party
Janata Dal (Secular) ministries
2016 establishments in Kerala
Cabinets established in 2016